Italy First was a regional charter airline based in Rimini in Italy. It also operates air taxi and air ambulance services. Its main base is Miramare Airport, Rimini. 
After operating on ACMI basis for Meridiana, AlpiEagles, Minerva, and finally Airone, at the end of 2005, the management sold the airplanes and retired from flight operations.

History 
The airline was established in 1999 and is 100% owned by Gruppo Condor.

Fleet 
The Italy First fleet at finish operations in January 2005.

References

External links

Italy First

Italian companies established in 1999
2005 disestablishments in Italy
Defunct airlines of Italy
Airlines established in 1999
Airlines disestablished in 2005